Pavlovo is a rural locality (a village) in Kubenskoye Rural Settlement, Vologodsky District, Vologda Oblast, Russia. The population was 16 as of 2002.

Geography 
The distance to Vologda is 41 km, to Kubenskoye is 12 km. GES is the nearest rural locality.

References 

Rural localities in Vologodsky District